Marianne Paulsen (born 20 May 1980) is a Norwegian football defender that played for Trondheims-Ørn until she retired from football at the end of 2007.  She played at right-back in Norway's team at the UEFA Women's Euro 2005.

References
Profile at club site

1980 births
Living people
People from Harstad
Norwegian women's footballers
Norway women's youth international footballers
Norway women's international footballers
Arna-Bjørnar players
SK Trondheims-Ørn players
Women's association football defenders
Sportspeople from Troms og Finnmark